Zhao Mengjian (1199–1295), art name Yizhai (彝齋居士), was a Chinese painter and politician from Haiyan, Zhejiang.

He was a member of the Song dynasty who attained high rank at court as a Mandarin, and became president of the Hanlin Academy, retiring when the dynasty fell. He was known for his depictions of daffodils, plum blossom, orchids and bamboo.

References

Bibliography 
.

Artists from Jiaxing
Painters from Zhejiang
Politicians from Jiaxing
Song dynasty painters
Song dynasty politicians from Zhejiang